List of hospitals in Kentucky (U.S. state), sorted by hospital name.

References

External links
Kentucky Hospitals Association hospitals

Kentucky
 
Hospitals